Kaspar Villiger (pronounced Caspar Feeleeger; born 5 February 1941) is a Swiss businessman, politician and former member of the Swiss Federal Council (1989–2003).

Political career 
On 1 February 1989, he was elected to the Swiss Federal Council. He is affiliated to the Free Democratic Party (Liberals).

During his time in office he headed the following departments:
 Federal Military Department (1989 – 1995)
 Federal Department of Finance (1996 – 2003)
He was President of the Confederation twice, in 1995 and again in 2002.

In 1995 Kaspar Villiger apologized on occasion of an official visit by Dan Culler who was an internee in the Wauwilermoos internment camp during World War II. Dwight Mears, a U.S. Army officer, covered the apology in his 2012 PhD thesis on the American internees in Switzerland.

In September 2003, he announced he was to resign on 31 December 2003.

Business career 
In 2004, he became member of the board of directors of Nestlé and Swiss Re.

On 15 April 2009, he was elected Chairman of the Board of Swiss banking giant UBS, holding this post until 3 May 2012. His successor was Axel A. Weber.

Other activities 

Kaspar Villiger is a Member of the Global Leadership Foundation, an organization which works to support democratic leadership, prevent and resolve conflict through mediation and promote good governance in the form of democratic institutions, open markets, human rights and the rule of law. It does so by making available, discreetly and in confidence, the experience of former leaders to today's national leaders. It is a not-for-profit organization composed of former heads of government, senior governmental and international organization officials who work closely with Heads of Government on governance-related issues of concern to them.

References

External links 

 Business activities of Kaspar Villiger, databot.ch

1941 births
Living people
Members of the Federal Council (Switzerland)
Finance ministers of Switzerland
Directors of Nestlé
Swiss Protestants
UBS people
People from Sursee District
Swiss chairpersons of corporations